The Penguin Islands are a historical group of mostly scattered islands and rocks situated along a stretch of  along the coastline of Namibia. Not forming a geographic whole, the Namibian government formally lists them as the Off-Shore islands. Their name comes from the presence of African penguins which inhabit the coastal region surrounding Namibia and South Africa.

Geography
The islands are scattered over a long coastal region. Although a few of them form small clusters or groups, such as the islands in Lüderitz Bay, the Penguin Islands lack the mutual proximity of a natural archipelago or island chain.

All islands together measure  in area.

Islands
Listed from the most northern to the most southern, the islands include the Penguin Islands (in the historic, narrower sense - printed in bold):

Hollam's Bird Island
Mercury Island
Ichaboe Island
Black Rock (S 26° 5' 0″	E 14° 58' 0″)
Staple Rock (S 26° 22' 0″ E 14° 58' 0″)
Marshall Reef (S 26° 22' 0″	E 14° 58' 0″)
Boat Bay Rocks (S 26° 25' 0″	E 15° 5' 0″)
Seal Island , Lüderitz Bay
Penguin Island, Lüderitz Bay
Halifax Island
North Long Island
South Long Island
Possession Island
Albatross Island
Pomona Island
Black Rock (S 24° 56' 0″	E 14° 48' 0″)
Black Sophie Rock (S 27° 38' 0″	E 15° 31' 0″)
Plumpudding Island
Sinclair Island (Roast Beef Island)
Little Roastbeef Islets (S 27° 42' 0″	E 15° 32' 0″)

History
Uninhabited, strategically located, rich in guano deposits and even offshore diamond fields, the islands had considerable value for their size. They were visited by European traders from the 17th century onwards, primarily for the valuable guano. Between 1861 and 1867 they were annexed by Britain, and then in 1873 by the Cape Colony. International confusion over the legality of the transfer required Prime Minister John Molteno of the Cape Colony to reaffirm the annexation later, with the Ichaboe and Penguin Islands Act (1874).

The annexation was originally intended to form part of an overall absorption of South West Africa into the Cape Colony forming one locally governed British colony. This was to be instituted by the Palgrave Commission (1876).

British interference and the resulting breakdown in relations between the British Empire and the local Cape government obstructed the Commission's work long enough for Germany to declare South West Africa a German protectorate in 1884 as part of the continent-wide Scramble for Africa. The offshore islands (and Walvis Bay) were excluded from German administration by their status as Cape constituencies. This status was recognised by Germany in 1886. Thus, although close to the mainland, the islands were not part of German South West Africa.

In 1990, South West Africa gained independence as Namibia. The Penguin Islands remained under South African sovereignty, thus letting it retain an Exclusive Economic Zone off the Namibian coast. After further negotiation, at midnight on 28 February 1994, sovereignty over the islands, as well as Walvis Bay, was transferred to Namibia.

References

Historical regions
Islands of Namibia
Islands of the South Atlantic Ocean
1861 establishments in the British Empire
1861 establishments in the Cape Colony
Guano trade
Penguins